President Roosevelt may refer to:
 Theodore Roosevelt (1858–1919), 26th president of the United States
 Presidency of Theodore Roosevelt, his presidency
 Franklin D. Roosevelt (1882–1945), 32nd president of the United States and fifth cousin of the 26th president
 Presidency of Franklin D. Roosevelt, his presidency

Other uses
 , several ships by the name
 , a oceanliner that was requisitioned for service as a troopship with the U.S. Navy
 , a U.S. Navy troopship
 President Theodore Roosevelt High School

See also
 Roosevelt (disambiguation)
 Roosevelt family